Jordan Shea Rashad Norwood (born September 29, 1986) is a Filipino-American former professional football wide receiver and punt returner who played eight seasons in the National Football League (NFL). He was signed by the Cleveland Browns as an undrafted free agent in 2009. He played college football at Penn State.

Norwood was also a member of the Philadelphia Eagles, Tampa Bay Buccaneers and Denver Broncos. Norwood is the son of Navy co-defensive coordinator and former Penn State secondary coach Brian Norwood.

College career

Norwood was lightly recruited out of State College Area High School. He received few scholarship offers and accepted Penn State's last minute offer over an offer from Bucknell to play football and basketball. His leadership and jumping skills on the basketball court was what led coach Joe Paterno to offer him a football scholarship.

In 2005, his freshman season, Norwood caught 32 passes for 422 yards with a 13.2 yard average.

Norwood's sophomore season concluded with him making the Dean's List and being named to the Academic All-Big Ten team. He caught 45 passes for 472 yards and two touchdowns with a 10.5 yard average. He joined the basketball team under Ed DeChellis in January, practicing regularly and appearing in four games as a reserve guard in his only season playing basketball.

In his junior season, Jordan caught 40 balls for 484 yards and five touchdowns with a 12.1 yard average including catching a touchdown pass lying down on the ground versus Buffalo. He had a season high eight catches for 65 yards and a touchdown in a 36-31 win over Indiana.

Norwood earned all-Big Ten honorable mention honors as a senior, after catching 41 passes for 637 yards and six touchdowns. Norwood's eight-catch, 116-yard performance versus Oregon State on September 6, 2008, moved him past O. J. McDuffie into third place on Penn State's career reception list. Afterward, he was congratulated in person by McDuffie, who attended the game. Norwood had a second consecutive 100 plus yard game on September 13, 2008, against the Syracuse Orange. He had five receptions for 113 yards and two touchdowns. Before the game against Illinois, Norwood injured his hamstring and didn't participate in the games against the Illini and the Boilermakers.

Professional career

Pre-draft
Norwood was invited to the 2009 NFL Scouting Combine where he measured a 38-inch vertical jump (sixth among wide receivers at the combine), ran 6.80 in the 3 cone drill (ninth among wide receivers at the combine), and 4.20 in the 20-yard shuttle (ninth among wide receivers at the combine).

Cleveland Browns
After being undrafted in the 2009 NFL Draft, Norwood signed with the Cleveland Browns as an undrafted free agent on May 1, 2009. He was waived by the Browns during final roster cuts on September 5, 2009.

Philadelphia Eagles
On September 23, 2009, Norwood was signed to the Philadelphia Eagles practice squad. He was promoted to the active roster on December 1, 2009. He was waived on December 7. On December 9, he was re-signed to their practice squad. He was re-signed to a three-year contract on January 11, 2010. On March 18, Norwood changed his number from 84 to 19 after Hank Baskett was re-signed by the Eagles and took number 84 back. Norwood was waived on September 4.

Cleveland Browns (second stint)
Norwood was signed to the Cleveland Browns' practice squad on September 6, 2010. He was promoted to the active roster before Week 13 of the 2010 season. In the 2011 season, he appeared in 14 games and started four. He had 23 receptions for 268 receiving yards and one touchdown, which came in Week 12 against the Cincinnati Bengals. In the 2012 season, he appeared in two games and had 13 receptions for 137 receiving yards. He was waived on August 25, 2013.

Tampa Bay Buccaneers
On August 28, 2013, Norwood signed with the Buccaneers. On August 31, 2013, he was cut by the Buccaneers.

Denver Broncos
Norwood signed with the Denver Broncos during the 2014 offseason. The Broncos placed Norwood on injured reserve on August 25, 2014, after he tore his ACL. In the 2015 regular season, he finished with 22 receptions for 207 receiving yards in 11 games and five starts. On February 7, 2016, Norwood was part of the Broncos team that won Super Bowl 50. In the game, the Broncos defeated the Carolina Panthers by a score of 24–10. In the game, Norwood set a Super Bowl record at that time for the longest punt return at 61 yards. The return set up a field goal that put the Broncos up 13–7.

On March 23, 2016, Norwood signed a one-year contract with the Denver Broncos after drawing interest from the New York Jets and Detroit Lions. In the 2016 season, Norwood finished with 21 receptions for 232 receiving yards and one receiving touchdown.

Retirement
On September 10, 2017, Norwood announced his retirement from the NFL.

Personal life
Norwood earned a Bachelor of Arts in Advertising/Public Relations from Penn State in 2008.

Jordan has two younger brothers, Zaccariah and Levi, a younger sister Brianna, and an older brother, Gabe, who is a former member of the George Mason University basketball team that advanced to the 2006 NCAA Final Four and is currently playing for the Philippine National basketball team, Gilas Pilipinas, and the Rain or Shine Elasto Painters in the Philippine Basketball Association. Levi played football for Baylor University.

Norwood was married on June 20, 2015. Norwood and his wife had their first child, a girl, on November 4, 2015.

References

External links

1986 births
Living people
American football return specialists
American football wide receivers
American sportspeople of Filipino descent
Cleveland Browns players
Denver Broncos players
Penn State Nittany Lions basketball players
Penn State Nittany Lions football players
Philadelphia Eagles players
People from State College, Pennsylvania
Players of American football from Pennsylvania
Basketball players from Pennsylvania
Players of American football from Honolulu
Tampa Bay Buccaneers players
American men's basketball players